Maharao Shekhaji (1433–1488) was a Kshatriya (Rajput) ruler in 15th-century India. He is the namesake of the Shekhawati region, comprising the districts of Sikar, Churu and Jhunjhunu in the modern Indian state of Rajasthan. His descendants are known as the Shekhawat.

Birth
On Rao Mokal's Death in AD 1445, the twelve year old Maharao Shekhaji Succeeded his father's estates at Amarsar. His parents are said to have sought prayers from a pir Sheikh, after whom Shekhaji was named.

Shekhaji succeeded as the head of the Nayan and Barwada estate, along with 24 more villages, at the age of 12, as a result of the untimely death of his father Mokal Ji in 1445.

Life
When Shekhaji inherited his father's estate, his reputation and power attracted the jealousy of the Lord Paramount of Amber. He was attacked, but thanks to the aid of the Punnee Pathans he successfully withstood the reiterated assaults of his suzerain lord. Up to this period they had acknowledged the Amber princes as liege lords, and in token of the alliance paid as tribute all the colts reared on the original estate. A dispute on this point was the ostensible cause (though subordinate to their rapid prosperity) of intermittent separations of the Shekhawat colonies from the parent state, which lasted until the reign of Sawai Jai Singh, who brought submission and pecuniary relief from them. Shekhaji left a well-established position to his youngest son Raimal.. After Rao Raimal, Rao Lunkaran (1548-1584) was made the Head of Amarsar. After is Death, the Ancestral seat of Amarsar was succeeded by his Son Rao Manohar. Later Shahpura, became the capital of Old Amarsar - Manoharpur line of Shekhawats.

Death

Shekhaji died in 1488 fighting the Gaur Rajputs in the war of Ghatwa defending the modesty and self-respect of a newlywed lady. Shekhaji took his last breath at Ralawta. A cenotaph (Chhatri) was built where he died. A statue of Shekhaji was also inaugurated in the same place by the President of India Smt. Pratibha Patil.

See also
History of Rajasthan
Rajput
Rajputana
James Tod
Shahpura

References

15th-century Indian monarchs
Shekhawati